The Analysis of Verbal Behavior (TAVB) is a scientific journal that was established in 1982 as a peer-reviewed psychology journal. It publishes research in the conceptual and empirical analysis of verbal behavior and problems of social importance.

History
The journal was created by Mark Sundberg in 1982 after he completed his PhD at Western Michigan University in 1980. TAVB was previously a newsletter called the VB Newsletters, and no publications appeared in 1984.

Editorship
The current editor (2012) is Anna I. Pétursdóttir, PhD, Texas Christian University, Fort Worth.

Importance of the journal

 The journal is indexed in PsycINFO, and it is published yearly by the Association for Behavior Analysis International (ABAI). It typically publishes 10–20 articles per year. Its ISSN is 08889-9401.
 TAVB is a delayed open access journal: recent reprints, volume 22, 2006 onwards, are available free from ABAI. From 1982 to 2000 TAVB has published 150 articles in Experimental Analysis of Behavior, Applied Behavior Analysis, and Conceptual Behavior Analysis. TAVB features scientific articles on the various functions of language such as mand, tact, intraverbals, listener behavior and rule-governed behavior, autoclitics, multiple control, private events, epistemology, language acquisition, language assessment and training, second languages, pedagogy, the verbal behavior of nonhumans, verbal behavior research methodology, and the history of verbal behavior analysis.

Notable authors
 B.F. Skinner
 Jack Michael

Technologies and applications

Verbal Behavior Milestones Assessment and Placement Program
VB MAPP is an example of technology used in behavioral interventions that is based on the type of research done in TAVB.

Functional analytic psychotherapy
Functional analytic psychotherapy is a treatment derived from Verbal Behavior analysis applied to adults with depression and other psycho-pathologies.

No details for its impact factors are available to date.

References

External links
 The Analysis of Verbal Behavior website
 VB MAPP

Behaviorism journals
Behaviorism
Linguistics journals
Publications established in 1982